Baksa district ( or ) is an administrative district in the Bodoland Territorial Region of Assam, one of the North-Eastern states of India. The administrative headquarters is at Mushalpur. Manas National Park is a part of this district.

History
Baksa was notified as one of the districts of Bodoland Territorial Council in October 2003 while it started functioning from 1 June 2004 when naturalist-bureaucrat Dr Anwaruddin Choudhury of the Assam Civil Service took charge as its founding Deputy Commissioner. It started working from PWD Inspection Bungalow of Barama on the NH 31 until it was shifted to Mushalpur in late 2010.

It was created from parts of Barpeta, Nalbari and Kamrup districts.

On 23 January 2022, Tamulpur district was created by separating Tamulpur sub-division of Baksa district.

Geography
This district is bounded by Bhutan in the north, Udalguri district in the east, Barpeta, Nalbari and Kamrup districts in the south and Chirang district in the west.

National protected area
Manas National Park (Part)

Administration
Mushalpur town is the headquarters of the district.

Divisions
The district has three sub-divisions: Mushalpur, Salbari and Tamulpur. These sub-divisions are further divided into 13 revenue circles: Baksa, Barama, Tamulpur, Goreswar, Baganpara, Ghograpar, Barnagar, Bajali, Jalah, Patharighat, Rangia, Sarupeta and Tihu.

Three Vidhan Sabha constituencies of this district are Tamulpur, Barama and Chapaguri. All of these are part of Kokrajhar Lok Sabha constituency.

Demographics

According to the 2011 census Baksa district has a population of 950,075. This gives it a ranking of 458th in India (out of a total of 640). Its population growth rate over the decade 2001-2011 was 11.17%. Baksa has a sex ratio of 967 females for every 1000 males, and a literacy rate of 70.53%. The residual Baksa district has a population of 560,925. Scheduled Castes and Tribes made up 30,837 (5.50%) and 209,686 (37.38%) of the population respectively.

According to the 2011 census, 38.34% of the population spoke Assamese, 36.33% Boro, 17.69% Bengali, 2.42% Nepali, 1.61% Sadri and 1.47% Kurukh as their first language.

Education
Major educational institutions of Baksa district are:
 Salbari Higher Secondary school, Salbari
 Bagadhar Brahma Kishan College, Jalah
 Barama College, Barama
 Goreswar College, Goreswar
 Mushalpur College, Mushalpur
 Tamulpur College, Tamulpur
 Koklabari chapaguri College, Simla Hazua
 Barama Higher Secondary school, Barama
 Baksa Polytechnic, Belguri Pathar
 Gyanpeeth Degree College, Nikashi
 Baksa College, Baganpara 
 Bathwou Ashram Foraisali, Barama
 Koklabari Girls' High School, Simla
 Kumarikata Junior College, Kumarikata
 Kendriya Vidyalaya, Tamulpur
 Ekalavya Model Residential School, Dalbari
 Anchali Higher Secondary School, Anchali
 Jawahar Navodaya Vidyalaya, Mushalpur

Tourism

Places of interest

A major part of the world-famous Manas National Park is located in this district. The park is well known for its Tiger, Greater One Horned Rhinoceros,  Wild Water Buffaloes and Golden Langurs. Bogamati, a famous picnic spot with picturesque beauties is located in Baksa. Bhangtar is the other scenic location situated close to Bhutan border.

See also

 State of Assam
 Tamulpur sub-division
 Mushalpur sub-division
 Salbari sub-division

References

External links
 Official website of the Baksa district

 
Districts of Assam
2003 establishments in Assam
Bodoland